Nowinki  is a village in the administrative district of Gmina Nowy Dwór Gdański, within Nowy Dwór Gdański County, Pomeranian Voivodeship, in northern Poland.

The village has a population of 160.

References

Villages in Nowy Dwór Gdański County